The 1995 Wimbledon Championships was a tennis tournament played on grass courts at the All England Lawn Tennis and Croquet Club in Wimbledon, London in the United Kingdom. It was the 109th edition of the Wimbledon Championships and were held from 26 June to 9 July 1995.

Prize money
The total prize money for 1995 championships was £6,025,550. The winner of the men's title earned £365,000 while the women's singles champion earned £328,000.

* per team

Champions

Seniors

Men's singles

 Pete Sampras defeated  Boris Becker, 6–7 (5–7), 6–2, 6–4, 6–2
 It was Sampras' 6th career Grand Slam title and his 3rd consecutive Wimbledon title.

Women's singles

 Steffi Graf defeated  Arantxa Sánchez Vicario, 4–6, 6–1, 7–5
 It was Graf's 18th career Grand Slam title and her 6th Wimbledon title.

Men's doubles

 Todd Woodbridge /  Mark Woodforde defeated  Rick Leach /  Scott Melville, 7–5, 7–6 (10–8), 7–6 (7–5)
 It was Woodbridge's 8th career Grand Slam title and his 4th Wimbledon title. It was Woodforde's 8th career Grand Slam title and his 3rd Wimbledon title.

Women's doubles

 Jana Novotná /  Arantxa Sánchez Vicario defeated  Gigi Fernández /  Natasha Zvereva, 5–7, 7–5, 6–4
 It was Novotná's 12th career Grand Slam title and her 4th Wimbledon title. It was Sánchez Vicario's 11th career Grand Slam title and her only Wimbledon title.

Mixed doubles

 Jonathan Stark /  Martina Navratilova defeated  Cyril Suk /  Gigi Fernández, 6–4, 6–4
 It was Navratilova's 56th career Grand Slam title and her 19th Wimbledon title. It was Stark's 2nd and last career Grand Slam title and his only Wimbledon title.

Juniors

Boys' singles

 Olivier Mutis defeated  Nicolas Kiefer, 6–2, 6–2

Girls' singles

 Aleksandra Olsza defeated  Tamarine Tanasugarn, 7–5, 7–6(8–6)

Boys' doubles

 Martin Lee /  James Trotman defeated  Alejandro Hernández /  Mariano Puerta, 7–6(7–2), 6–4

Girls' doubles

 Cara Black /  Aleksandra Olsza defeated  Trudi Musgrave /  Jodi Richardson, 6–0, 7–6(7–5)

Singles seeds

Men's singles
  Andre Agassi (semifinals, lost to Boris Becker)
  Pete Sampras (champion)
  Boris Becker (final, lost to Pete Sampras)
  Goran Ivanišević (semifinals, lost to Pete Sampras)
  Michael Chang (second round, lost to Petr Korda)
  Yevgeny Kafelnikov (quarterfinals, lost to Goran Ivanišević)
  Wayne Ferreira (fourth round, lost to Jacco Eltingh)
  Sergi Bruguera (withdrew before the tournament began)
  Michael Stich (first round, lost to Jacco Eltingh)
  Marc Rosset (first round, lost to Michael Joyce)
  Jim Courier (second round, lost to Cédric Pioline)
  Richard Krajicek (first round, lost to Bryan Shelton)
  Stefan Edberg (second round, lost to Dick Norman)
  Todd Martin (fourth round, lost to Goran Ivanišević)
  Andriy Medvedev (second round, lost to Jeff Tarango)
  Guy Forget (second round, lost to Greg Rusedski)

Women's singles
  Steffi Graf (champion)
  Arantxa Sánchez Vicario (final, lost to Steffi Graf)
  Conchita Martínez (semifinals, lost to Arantxa Sánchez Vicario)
  Jana Novotná (semifinals, lost to Steffi Graf)
  Mary Pierce (second round, lost to Nathalie Tauziat)
  Kimiko Date (quarterfinals, lost to Jana Novotná)
  Lindsay Davenport (fourth round, lost to Mary Joe Fernández)
  Gabriela Sabatini (quarterfinals, lost to Conchita Martínez)
  Anke Huber (fourth round, lost to Arantxa Sánchez Vicario)
  Natasha Zvereva (third round, lost to Inés Gorrochategui)
  Iva Majoli (first round, lost to Angélica Gavaldón)
  Amy Frazier (second round, lost to Irina Spîrlea)
  Mary Joe Fernández (quarterfinals, lost to Steffi Graf)
  Naoko Sawamatsu (third round, lost to Petra Kamstra)
  Brenda Schultz-McCarthy (quarterfinals, lost to Arantxa Sánchez Vicario)
  Helena Suková (second round, lost to Yone Kamio)

References

External links
 Official Wimbledon Championships website

 
Wimbledon Championships
Wimbledon Championships
June 1995 sports events in the United Kingdom
July 1995 sports events in the United Kingdom